Liberty Harbor is a neighborbood in Jersey City, New Jersey situated on the Morris Canal Big Basin opppostie Liberty State Park. It was originally conceived in the 1970s to replace disused land and brownfields. The neighborhood masterplan follows concepts of new urbanism; the masterplan was originally created by architectural firm Duany and Plater-Zyberk. 

The Marin Boulevard station aned  Jersey Avenue station of the  Hudson–Bergen Light Rail served the neighborhood. The Liberty Water Taxi ferry route between Lower Manhattan and Liberty Harbor was inaugurated in 2009.

See also

Downtown Jersey City
Hudson Waterfront

References

Neighborhoods in Jersey City, New Jersey
New Urbanism communities